Simon Thomas (born ) is an English television presenter who worked on Blue Peter for six years, and presented live Premier League football on Sky Sports from 2016 to 2018.

Early life
Thomas was born in Norwich, Norfolk, to Andrew and Gill Thomas. He has two sisters, Hannah and Rebecca. Although Thomas initially grew up in Cromer, and then Grimston, where he attended Grimston Primary and Middle School, the family later moved to Surrey, where he attended Aberdour School in Tadworth, Surrey and St. John's School, Leatherhead. After leaving school, he went to Birmingham University, where he graduated with a 2:1 BA Hons degree in history.

Broadcasting career

Blue Peter
Having applied for the job three times, Thomas began presenting the children's programme Blue Peter on 8 January 1999 replacing the sacked presenter Richard Bacon. Previously he had worked as a runner at Children's BBC and the radio station LBC. During his tenure at Blue Peter, he ran in the London Marathon twice and two Great North Runs, climbed Mount Kilimanjaro and Mont Blanc, completed over 40 solo sky dives with the Royal Air Force, presented a medal at the Commonwealth Games, ran in the 60 metres sprint at the Norwich Union Indoor Athletics against Frankie Fredericks and Darren Campbell and even directed an edition of the show.  He also presented the Queen with a Gold Blue Peter badge when she visited the studio and remarked on presenting Her Majesty with the badge that "she could get into the Tower of London free with it."

Thomas co-presented with Stuart Miles, Katy Hill, Konnie Huq, Matt Baker, Liz Barker and Zöe Salmon.

Thomas announced his intention to leave Blue Peter in January 2005, and his last live show was aired on 25 April of that year.

BBC
Thomas presented CBBC Proms in the Park in Hyde Park in 2001 with Matt Baker and Faye Tozer, and in 2002 with Fearne Cotton. He also presented BBC Radio 3's Making Tracks with Matt Baker.

Sky Sports
After leaving the BBC, Thomas joined Sky Sports in June 2005 and presented the 15:00–19:00 shift on Sky Sports News, alongside Georgie Thompson. He also presented Cricket AM during the summer on Sky Sports 1 with Sarah-Jane Mee and has presented the Sky Sports Victory Shield, England's U21s games, Centenary Shield, International Cricket, Sky Sports News Cricket World Cup Report, the Mosconi Cup from Las Vegas, Sky Sports World Cup report from Cape Town 2010 and Sky Sports News's coverage of the 2010 Ryder Cup.

At the start of the 2010/2011 Football Season, Thomas became the lead presenter of Sky Sports' live Football League coverage, leaving his position on Sky Sports News. From 2014, Thomas began presenting live League Cup football on Sky Sports, following Ben Shephard stepping down from all live match presenting duties. From August 2016, Thomas has presented live Premier League coverage, most notably on Saturday lunch times and bank holidays, following the departure of Ed Chamberlin to ITV Racing, and David Jones' subsequent promotion to Super Sunday and Monday Night Football lead presenter. Thomas regularly works alongside pundits such as Graeme Souness, Jamie Redknapp and Thierry Henry.

This Morning

In May 2019 Thomas took part in a three-part mini series for This Morning called 'Pursuits of Happiness'. The series showed three different activities people took part in to overcome and deal with their mental health issues.

In September 2019 Thomas appeared on the show to raise awareness for blood cancer symptoms.

Other work
In August 2009 and August 2010, Thomas compered on the Main Stage at Greenbelt, a Christian music and arts Festival held at Cheltenham Racecourse.

Personal life
Thomas lives in Reading, Berkshire and has a son. He is a Christian and a lifelong supporter of Norwich City and vice-president of the Norwich City Supporters Trust.

Thomas's first wife, Gemma, died on 24 November 2017, just three days after being diagnosed with acute myeloid leukaemia.

In July 2021, Thomas married his girlfriend Derrina Jebb at Norwich Cathedral. On 6 October 2022 he announced the premature birth of a daughter.

References

External links

Alumni of the University of Birmingham
Blue Peter presenters
English television presenters
People educated at St John's School, Leatherhead
People from Cromer
1973 births
Living people
People educated at Aberdour School
English Christians
Sky Sports presenters and reporters